Friedrich Hasenöhrl (30 November 1874 – 7 October 1915) was an Austrian physicist.

Life
Friedrich Hasenöhrl was born in Vienna, Austria-Hungary in 1874. His father was a lawyer and his mother belonged to a prominent aristocratic family.  After his elementary education, he studied natural science and mathematics at the University of Vienna under Joseph Stefan (1835–1893) and Ludwig Boltzmann (1844–1906). In 1896, he attained a doctorate under Franz-Serafin Exner with a thesis titled "Über den Temperaturkoeffizienten der Dielektrizitätskonstante in Flüssigkeiten und die Mosotti-Clausius'sche Formel".

He worked under Heike Kamerlingh Onnes in Leiden at the low temperature laboratory, and there he also befriended H. A. Lorentz.

In 1907 he became Boltzmann's successor at the University of Vienna as the head of the Department of Theoretical Physics. He had a number of illustrious pupils there and had an especially significant impact on Erwin Schrödinger, who later won the Nobel Prize for Physics for his contributions to quantum mechanics.

In an autobiography, Schrödinger claimed "no other human being had a greater influence on me than Fritz Hasenöhrl, except perhaps my father Rudolph".

When the war broke out in 1914, he volunteered at once into the Austria-Hungarian army. He fought as Oberleutnant against the Italians in Tyrol.  He was wounded, recovered and returned to the front. He was then killed by a grenade in an attack on Mount Plaut (Folgaria) on 7 October 1915 at the age of 40.

Cavity radiation

Since J. J. Thomson in 1881, many physicists like Wilhelm Wien (1900), Max Abraham (1902), and Hendrik Lorentz (1904) used equations equivalent to

for the so-called "electromagnetic mass", which expresses how much electromagnetic energy contributes to the mass of bodies. And Henri Poincaré (1900) implicitly used the expression m=E/c2 for the mass of electromagnetic energy.

Following this line of thought, Hasenöhrl (1904, 1905) published several papers on the inertia of a cavity containing radiation. This was an entirely classical derivation (no use of special relativity) and used Maxwell's equation for the pressure of light. Hasenöhrl specifically associated the "apparent" mass via inertia with the energy concept through the equation:

,

where μ is the apparent mass, E0 is the radiation energy, and  the speed of light. Subsequently, he used the notation:

,

where hε0 is the radiation energy. He also concluded that this result is valid for all radiating bodies, i.e. for all bodies whose temperature is > 0°K. For this result Hasenöhrl was awarded the Haitinger Prize of the Austrian Academy of Sciences. He wrote in 1904:

However, it was shown by Abraham that Hasenöhrl's calculation for the apparent mass was incorrect, so he published another paper in 1905, where he presented Abraham's criticism and corrected his formula to:

This was the same relation (as Hasenöhrl noted himself) as for the electromagnetic mass formula given above. Hasenöhrl's results (concerning apparent mass and thermodynamics) by using cavity radiation was further elaborated and criticized by Kurd von Mosengeil (1906/7) who already incorporated Albert Einstein's theory of relativity in his work. A broad outline of relativistic thermodynamics and mass-energy equivalence using cavity radiation was given by Max Planck in 1907.

In some additional papers (1907, 1908) Hasenöhrl elaborated further on his 1904-work and concluded that his new results were now in accordance to the theories of Mosengeil and Planck. However, he complained about the fact that Planck (1907) did not mention his earlier 1904-results (like the dependency of apparent mass on temperature). In 1908 Planck wrote that the results of Hasenöhrl's new approach from 1907 were indeed equivalent to those of relativity.

Afterwards, several authors gave credit to Hasenöhrl for his 1904 achievements on cavity radiation.

Explanations
There are different explanations for this result and its deviation from the relativistic formula . Enrico Fermi and others argued that this problem is analogous to the so-called 4/3 problem of electromagnetic mass. That is, if Hasenöhrl had included the shell in his calculations in a way consistent with relativity, the pre-factor of 4/3 would have been 1, so yielding . He could not have done this, since he did not have relativistic mechanics, with which he could model the shell.

On the other hand, Stephen Boughn and Tony Rothman in 2011 (and Boughn in 2012), who gave a historical account of different solutions to the problem, argued that the above explanation is insufficient. After providing a complete relativistic description and solution of the cavity problem (in the "constant velocity case" and  "slow acceleration case"), they wrote:

Hasenöhrl and Einstein

The formulas for electromagnetic mass (like those of Hasenöhrl's) were similar to the famous equation for mass–energy equivalence:

published by Albert Einstein in September 1905 in the Annalen der Physik —a few editions after Hasenöhrl published his results on cavity radiation. The similarity between those formulas led some critics of Einstein, up until the 1930s, to claim that he plagiarized the formula.

As an example, Phillip Lenard published a paper in 1921 in which he gave priority for "E=mc²" to Hasenöhrl (Lenard also gave credit to Johann Georg von Soldner and Paul Gerber in relation to some effects of general relativity).
However, Max von Laue quickly rebutted those claims by saying that the inertia of  electromagnetic energy was long known before Hasenöhrl, especially by the works of Henri Poincaré (1900) and Max Abraham (1902), while Hasenöhrl only used their results for his calculation on cavity radiation. Laue continued by saying that credit for establishing the inertia of all forms of energy (the real mass-energy equivalence) goes to Einstein, who was also the first to understand the deep implications of that equivalence in relation to relativity.

Known family
 Married Ella Brückner and had at least one known son, Victor Hasenohrl (? - 1982) who married Elizabeth Sayre (? - 1968)
 Victor Hasenohrl (? - 1982) who married Elizabeth Sayre (? - 1968) had three adopted children:
 Frederick Hasenohrl [deceased] who married Victoria ? (?-?) who had two children:
 Children: 
 Frederick Hasenohrl (?- )
 Issca (?- )
 Elizabeth Sayre Reich (1937-2015) who married Joseph D. Reich (1928-2000) who had two adopted children:
 Children: 
Daniel Stuart Reich (1964- ) who lives in Lutherville, Maryland, USA.
Eric Kent Reich (1966- ) who lives in Boyds, Maryland, USA.
 Margaret Hasenohrl (1942- ) who never married and resides in Silver Spring, Maryland, USA.

Publications
Hasenöhrl's papers on cavity radiation and thermodynamics

See also
 Mass–energy equivalence
 History of special relativity

Notes and references

Further reading
 Lenard, Philipp, Great Men of Science. Translated from the second German edition, G. Bell and sons, London (1950) 
 Moore, Walter  "Schrödinger:  Life and Thought" University of Cambridge (1989) .

External links

 Lebenslauf von Friedrich Hasenöhrl
 Career at University of Vienna
Military record 

Hasenohrl,Friedrich
Hasenohrl,Friedrich
Hasenohrl,Friedrich
Hasenohrl,Friedrich
Austro-Hungarian military personnel killed in World War I
Deaths by hand grenade
Physicists from the Austro-Hungarian Empire